Chemistry is a branch of physical science, and the study of the substances of which matter is composed.

Chemistry may also refer to:

Science 
 Chemistry (word), the history and use of the word
 Chemistry: A European Journal, an academic periodical
 Advanced Placement Chemistry, a course offered in the Advanced Placement Program

Film and television 
 Chemistry (2009 film), a Malayalam film by Viji Thampi
 Chemistry (serial), a 2010 Pakistani television drama serial that aired on Geo Entertainment
 Chemistry (TV series), a 2011 American erotic comedy/thriller television series that aired on Cinemax
 Chemistry: A Volatile History, a 2010 BBC documentary
 "Chemistry" (The New Batman Adventures), an episode of The New Batman Adventures
 "Chemistry" (Smash), a 2012 episode of Smash

Music 
 Chemistry (band), a Japanese R&B duo

Albums 
 Chemistry (Buckshot and 9th Wonder album), 2005
 Chemistry (Girls Aloud album), 2005
 Chemistry: The Tour, a 2006 concert tour by Girls Aloud
 Chemistry (Houston Person and Ron Carter album), 2016
 Chemistry (Johnny Gill album), 1985
 Chemistry (Mondo Rock album), 1981
 Chemistry, a 1997 compilation album by Nirvana (UK band)
 Chemistry, a 2004 debut album by Austrian singer zeebee

Extended plays
 Chemistry (Trouble Maker EP), 2013
 Chemistry (Virtual Riot EP), 2016
 Chemistry (Falz and Simi EP), 2016
 Chemistry, an EP by Stereo Junks, which involved Anzi Destruction
 Chemistry, an EP by Grynch, with One Be Lo

Songs 
 "Chemistry" (Eva Simons song), 2013
 "Chemistry" (Mondo Rock song), 1981
 "Chemistry" (Semisonic song), 2001
 "Chemistry", by Alcazar from Alcazarized, 2003
 "Chemistry", by All Time Low from Last Young Renegade, 2017
 "Chemistry", by Arcade Fire from Everything Now, 2017
 "Chemistry", by Jawbreaker from Dear You, 1995
 "Chemistry", by the Nolans from Portrait, 1982
 "Chemistry", by Rush from Signals, 1982
 "Chemistry", by Shinee from The Story of Light, 2018
 "Chemistry", by Unkle from War Stories, 2007

Other 
 Chemistry.com, an online dating service
 Chemistry (relationship), a complex emotion that arises when two people share a special connection
 Interpersonal attraction or interpersonal chemistry, an attraction between people that leads to friendships and romantic relationships

See also 
 
 
 Chemical (disambiguation)